Knock on Any Door is a 1949 American courtroom trial film noir directed by Nicholas Ray and starring Humphrey Bogart. The picture gave actor John Derek his breakthrough role, and was based on the 1947 novel of the same name by Willard Motley.

Plot
Against the wishes of his law partners, slick talking lawyer Andrew Morton takes the case of Nick Romano, a troubled punk from the slums, partly because he himself came from the same slums, and partly because he feels guilty for his partner botching the criminal trial of Nick's father years earlier. Nick is on trial for viciously killing a policeman point-blank and faces execution if convicted.

Nick's history is shown through flashbacks showing him as a hoodlum committing one petty crime after another. Morton's wife Adele convinces him to play nursemaid to Nick in order to make Nick a better person. Nick then robs Morton of $100 after a fishing trip.  Shortly after that, Nick marries Emma, and he tries to change his lifestyle. He takes on job after job but keeps getting fired because of his recalcitrance. He wastes his paycheck playing dice, wanting to buy Emma some jewelry, and then walks out on another job after punching his boss. Feeling a lack of hope of ever being able to live a normal life, Nick decides to return to his old ways, sticking to his motto: "Live fast, die young, and have a good-looking corpse." He leaves Emma, even after she tells him that she is pregnant. After he commits a botched hold-up at a train station, he returns to Emma so as to take her with him as he flees. He finds that she had committed suicide by gas from an open oven door.

Morton's strategy in the courtroom is to argue that slums breed criminals and that society (of which every member of the jury is part) is to blame for crimes committed by people who live in such miserable conditions. Morton argues that Romano is a victim of society and not a natural-born killer. Yet, his strategy does not have the desired effect on the jury, thanks to the badgering of the seasoned and experienced District Attorney Kernan, who delivers question after question until Nick shouts out his admission of guilt. Morton, who is naive to believe in his client's innocence, is shocked by Nick's confession. Nick decides to change his plea to guilty. During the sentencing hearing, Morton manages to arouse some sympathy for the plight of those in a dead-end existence. He pleads that if you "knock on any door" you may find a Nick Romano. Nevertheless, Nick is sentenced to die in the electric chair. Morton visits Nick prior to the execution and watches him walk the last mile to his just reward.

Cast

 Humphrey Bogart as Andrew Morton
 John Derek as Nick Romano
 George Macready as Dist. Atty. Kerman
 Allene Roberts as Emma
 Candy Toxton as Adele Morton (credited as Susan Perry)
 Mickey Knox as Vito
 Barry Kelley as Judge Drake
Uncredited
 Cara Williams as Nelly Watkins
 Jimmy Conlin as Kid Fingers
 Sumner Williams as Jimmy
 Sid Melton as "Squint" Zinsky
 Pepe Hern as Juan Rodriguez
 Dewey Martin as Butch
 Davis Roberts as Jim 'Sunshine' Jackson
 Houseley Stevenson as Junior
 Vince Barnett as Bartender
 Thomas Sully as Officer Hawkins
 Florence Auer as Aunt Lena
 Pierre Watkin as Purcell
 Gordon Nelson as Corey
 Argentina Brunetti as Ma Romano
 Dick Sinatra as Julian Romano
 Carol Coombs as Ang Romano
 Joan Baxter as Maria Romano
 Dooley Wilson as Piano player
 Helen Mowery as Miss Holiday
 Chester Conklin as Barber
 George Chandler as Cashier

Background
Producer Mark Hellinger purchased the rights to Knock on Any Door (a novel by the African American novelist Willard Motley) and Humphrey Bogart and Marlon Brando were to star in the production.  However, after Hellinger died in late 1947, Robert Lord and Bogart formed a corporation to produce the film: Santana Productions, named after Bogart's private sailing yacht. Jack L. Warner was reportedly furious at this, fearing that other stars would do the same and major studios would lose their power.

According to critic Hal Erickson, the often-repeated credo spoken by the character Nick Romano--"Live fast, die young, and have a good-looking corpse"—would become the "clarion call for a generation of disenfranchised youth."

Reception

Critical response
Treating criminality with kid gloves and blaming law abiding society for  its ills didn't go over well with the public or the critics. Bosley Crowther, film critic for The New York Times, called the film "a pretentious social melodrama" and blasted the film's message and the screenplay.  He wrote, "Rubbish! The only shortcoming of society which this film proves is that it casually tolerates the pouring of such fraudulence onto the public mind. Not only are the justifications for the boy's delinquencies inept and superficial, as they are tossed off in the script, but the nature and aspect of the hoodlum are outrageously heroized."

The staff at Variety magazine was more receptive of the film, writing: "An eloquent document on juvenile delinquency, its cause and effect, has been fashioned from Knock on Any Door...Nicholas Ray's direction stresses the realism of the script taken from Willard Motley's novel of the same title, and gives the film a hard, taut pace that compels complete attention."

Adaption
In 1960 a sequel to the film, Let No Man Write My Epitaph, was produced and directed by Philip Leacock starring Burl Ives, Shelley Winters, James Darren, Ella Fitzgerald, among others. It was based on the 1958 novel of the same name by Willard Motley.

References

External links
 
 
 
 
 
 

1949 films
1949 drama films
American black-and-white films
Columbia Pictures films
American courtroom films
Film noir
Films based on American novels
Films directed by Nicholas Ray
Films set in Chicago
Films scored by George Antheil
American drama films
1940s English-language films
1940s American films